NGC 5829 is a spiral galaxy in the constellation Boötes that is interacting with the irregular galaxy IC 4526. Together, the two form the galaxy pair Arp 42.

References

External links
 

Boötes
Interacting galaxies
5829
09673
53709
Unbarred spiral galaxies
042